Cape Cleveland may refer to:
 Cape Cleveland, Avannaata, a headland in Northwest Greenland
 Cape Cleveland, Lincoln Sea, a headland in North Greenland
 Cape Cleveland, Queensland, a residential coastal suburb of the Townsville, Queensland, Australia
 Cape Cleveland, a promontory near Townsville, Queensland, Australia, see Cape Cleveland Light